Barrios de Colina is a municipality and town located in the province of Burgos, Castile and León, Spain. According to the 2004 census (INE), the municipality has a population of 76 inhabitants.

The municipality of Barrios de Colina is made up of three towns: Barrios de Colina (seat or capital), Hiniestra and San Juan de Ortega.

References 

Municipalities in the Province of Burgos